The British Empire/Commonwealth Heavyweight Championship was one of the first Heavyweight professional wrestling championships in the United Kingdom and Australia

The championship was recognised and defended on matches screened by UK national television network ITV as part of the professional wrestling slot on World of Sport as well as standalone broadcasts. Pre-publicity for these championship match broadcasts was given in ITV's nationally published listings magazine TVTimes The retirement of final champion Count Bartelli in 1986 received coverage from sources such as ITN.

Title history

See also

Professional wrestling in the United Kingdom

References

External links

Heavyweight wrestling championships
National professional wrestling championships
Professional wrestling in the United Kingdom